The 1974–75 Coppa Italia was the 28th Coppa Italia, the major Italian domestic cup. The competition was won by Fiorentina.

First round

Group 1

Group 2

Group 3

Group 4

Group 5

Group 6

Group 7

Second round 
Join the defending champion: Bologna.

Group A

Group B

Final

Top goalscorers

References
rsssf.com

Coppa Italia seasons
Coppa